John Thornborough (1551–1641) was an English bishop.

Life

Thornborough was born in Salisbury, and graduated from Magdalen College, Oxford.

In a long ecclesiastical career, he was employed as a chaplain by the Earl of Pembroke, and Queen Elizabeth. He was Dean of York, Bishop of Limerick in 1593, Bishop of Bristol in 1603, and Bishop of Worcester from 1617. He was appointed Clerk of the Closet in 1588, serving Queen Elizabeth I in that capacity until the end of her reign in 1603.

He was tolerant of Puritans, encouraging his congregation to attend puritan lectures. He also shielded the future biographer Samuel Clarke (1599–1683).

He wrote an alchemical book, Lithotheorikos of 1621. He is known to have employed Simon Forman. Robert Fludd dedicated Anatomiae Amphitheatrum (1623) to Thornborough.

References

Further reading
A. L. Rowse, "Bishop Thornborough: A Clerical Careerist", in Richard Ollard and Pamela Tudor-Craig (editors), For Veronica Wedgwood These Studies in Seventeenth-Century History (1986)

External links

1551 births
1641 deaths
Alumni of Magdalen College, Oxford
16th-century alchemists
16th-century Anglican bishops in Ireland
17th-century alchemists
17th-century Anglican bishops in Ireland
17th-century English writers
17th-century English male writers
Anglican chaplains
Bishops of Bristol
Bishops of Limerick (Church of Ireland)
Bishops of Worcester
Clerks of the Closet
Deans of York
English alchemists
English chaplains
English male writers
17th-century Church of England bishops